Gaibiel is a  in the comarca of Alto Palancia, Castellón, Valencia, Spain.

References 

1. Law 4/1983 of 23 November 1983 relating to the use and teaching of Valencian language [archive]

Municipalities in the Province of Castellón
Alto Palancia